The timeline of the COVID-19 pandemic lists the articles containing the chronology and epidemiology of SARS-CoV-2, the virus that causes the coronavirus disease 2019 (COVID-19) and is responsible for the COVID-19 pandemic.

The first human cases of COVID-19 were identified in Wuhan, People's Republic of China, in December 2019. The World Health Organization declared the COVID-19 outbreak a Public Health Emergency of International Concern on 30 January 2020, and a pandemic on 11 March 2020. At this moment, we cannot conclusively determine precisely how humans in mainland China were initially or previously infected with the virus, called SARS-CoV-2. Furthermore, some developments may become known or fully understood only in retrospect.

Worldwide timelines by month and year
The 2019 and January 2020 timeline articles include the initial responses as subsections, and more comprehensive timelines by nation-state are listed below this section. 

The following are the timelines of the COVID-19 pandemic respectively in: 
 2019
 2020
 January 2020
 February 2020
 March 2020
 April 2020
 May 2020
 June 2020
 July 2020
 August 2020
 September 2020
 October 2020
 November 2020
 December 2020
 2021
 January 2021
 February 2021
 March 2021
 April 2021
 May 2021
 June 2021
 July 2021
 August 2021 
 September 2021 
 October 2021 
 November 2021 
 December 2021 
 2022
 January 2022
 February 2022
 March 2022
 April 2022
 May 2022
 June 2022
 July 2022
 August 2022
 September 2022
 October 2022
 November 2022 
 December 2022 
 2023
 January 2023
 February 2023
 March 2023
 April 2023
 May 2023
 Responses
The following are responses to the COVID-19 pandemic respectively in:
 2020
 January 2020
 February 2020
 March 2020
 April 2020
 May 2020
 June 2020
 July 2020
 August 2020
 September 2020
 October 2020
 November 2020
 December 2020
 2021
 January 2021
 February 2021
 March 2021
 April 2021
 May 2021
 June 2021
 July 2021
 August 2021
 September 2021
 October 2021
 November 2021
 December 2021
 2022
 January 2022
 February 2022
 March 2022
 April 2022
 May 2022
 June 2022
 July 2022
 August 2022
 September 2022
 October 2022

Timeline by country

Some of the timelines listed below also contain responses. The following are the timeline of the COVID-19 pandemic in:
  Argentina
  Australia
  Australia (2020)
  Australia (January–June 2021)
  Australia (July–December 2021)
  Australia (2022)
  Bangladesh
  Belarus
  Brazil
  Canada
  Ontario (2020)
  Ontario (2021)
  Ontario (2022)
  Quebec
  Saskatchewan
  Croatia
  Egypt
  Fiji
  Ghana
  Ghana (March–July 2020)
  Ghana (August–December 2020)
  Ghana (2021)
  India
  India (January–May 2020)
  India (June–December 2020)
  India (2021)
  Kerala
  Indonesia
  Indonesia (2020)
  Indonesia (2021)
  Indonesia (2022)
  Iran
  Ireland, Republic of
  Republic of Ireland (2020)
  Republic of Ireland (2021)
  Republic of Ireland (2022)
  Italy
  Ivory Coast
  Japan
  Malaysia
  Malaysia (2020)
  Malaysia (2021)
  Malaysia (2022)
  Malaysia (2023)
  Malta
  Mexico
  Nepal
  New Zealand
  New Zealand (2020)
  New Zealand (2021)
  New Zealand (2022)
  New Zealand (2023)
  Nigeria
  Nigeria (February–June 2020)
  Nigeria (July–December 2020)
  Nigeria (2021)
  Pakistan
  Philippines
  Philippines (2020)
  Philippines (2021)
  Philippines (2022)
  Romania
  Russia
  Russia (January–June 2020)
  Russia (July–December 2020)
  Serbia
  Singapore
  Singapore (2020)
  Singapore (2021)
  Singapore (2022)
  South Africa
  Spain
  Sweden
  Thailand
  Trinidad and Tobago
  Turkey
  United Kingdom
  United Kingdom (January–June 2020)
  United Kingdom (July–December 2020)
  England (January–June 2020)
  England (July–December 2020)
  Northern Ireland (2020)
  Scotland (2020)
  Wales (2020)
  United Kingdom (January–June 2021)
  United Kingdom (July–December 2021)
  England (2021)
  Northern Ireland (2021)
  Scotland (2021)
  Wales (2021)
  United Kingdom (January–June 2022)
  United Kingdom (July–December 2022)
  England (2022)
  Wales (2022)
  Scotland (2022)
  Northern Ireland (2022)
   United States
  United States (2020)
  United States (2021)
  California
  Maryland
  Massachusetts
  Boston
  Texas
  Uruguay
  Uruguay (2020)
  Uruguay (2021)
  Vietnam

Worldwide cases by month and year
The following are COVID-19 pandemic cases in:
 January 2020
 February 2020
 March 2020
 April 2020
 May 2020
 June 2020
 July 2020
 August 2020
 September 2020
 October 2020
 November 2020
 December 2020
 January 2021
 February 2021
 March 2021
 April 2021
 May 2021
 June 2021
 July 2021
 August 2021

References

External links 
 Next hCoV-19 app, an interactive timeline provided by GISAID tracking the spread of SARS-CoV-2 viral strains around the world
 Timeline of WHO's response to COVID-19

 
Covid